Virgil A. Martin (October 15, 1874 – January 9, 1941) was a business executive and member of the Los Angeles City Council between 1927 and 1931.

Biography
Martin was born October 15, 1874 in Tecumseh, Nebraska, the son of Judson W. Martin and Ennis C. Smith. He was taken to Troy, New York, when he was one year old, where he attended elementary, high school and Troy College, from which he earned an engineering degree in 1891. He was married to Lilly F. Ward of Boston, Massachusetts that same year. He moved to Los Angeles in 1906 as a representative of the Boston Woven Hose and Rubber Company. Later he was a mechanical engineer, sales engineer and then district manager of the B. F. Goodrich Company. He was in charge of government relations for the company during  World War I, including overseeing its balloon schools and shipyards. He left Goodrich in 1925.

He joined the West Adams Methodist Episcopal Church when he moved to Los Angeles. After his retirement, Martin was chairman of the board of the Union Rescue Mission. He died of a heart attack January 9, 1941 in his home at 2934 S. Hobart Boulevard, between West Adams and West Jefferson Boulevards and was survived by his wife and a sister, Gertrude Martin.

Public service

Martin ran for the 5th District City Council seat in 1927 as an anti-Cryer candidate and trounced the incumbent, Robert Stewart Sparks, by a vote of 7,843 to 2,889. He was reelected in 1929 over S. DeVier Ely but lost in 1931 to Roy L. Donley.

By November 1930, Martin was "generally recognized as spokesman for Mayor [John C.] Porter in the Council chambers."

Martin also was a chairman of the Police and Fire commissions and a member of the Public Works and Harbor commissions.

In January 1930, Martin and seven other council members who had voted in favor of granting a rock-crushing permit in the Santa Monica Mountains were unsuccessfully targeted for recall on the grounds that the eight

Alphonzo Bell, Samuel Traylor and Chapin A. Day, all multi-millionaires, to grant this group a special spot zoning permit to crush and ship . . . from the high-class residential section of Santa Monica, limestone and rock for cement.

References

Access to the Los Angeles Times links may require the use of a library card.

Los Angeles City Council members
1874 births
1941 deaths
People from Tecumseh, Nebraska